Martyn Fotheringham (born 23 March 1983) is a Scottish footballer and coach, who played as a midfielder. He was previously part of the management team at Forfar Athletic.

He started his career with St Johnstone and has since also played for Brechin, Montrose, Cowdenbeath and Montrose.

Post-retirement
On 27 April 2019, 37-year old Fotheringham announced his retirement but continued as a part of the coaching staff at Montrose. On 13 November 2019, he was hired as a first team coach at his former club, Forfar Athletic, under manager Stuart Malcolm.

It was announced on 9 April 2021 via previous manager Stuart Malcolms Twitter that Malcolm and his two assistants Fotheringham and Barry Sellars had left the club.

Career statistics

References

External links 

1983 births
Living people
Footballers from Perth, Scotland
Scottish footballers
Association football midfielders
St Johnstone F.C. players
Brechin City F.C. players
Montrose F.C. players
Cowdenbeath F.C. players
Forfar Athletic F.C. players
Scottish Premier League players
Scottish Football League players
Scottish Professional Football League players